Shahrak-e Esteqlal may refer to:
 Shahrak-e Esteqlal, Fars
 Shahrak-e Esteqlal, Ilam